Famous Rainy Day is a 1995 studio album by Ian Shaw.

Only 5,000 copies of Famous Rainy Day were printed, and the record company, EFZ Records went out of business shortly afterwards.

References

1995 albums
Ian Shaw (singer) albums